Hyporatasa is a genus of snout moths. It was described by Hans Rebel in 1901 and contains the species Hyporatasa allotriella described by Gottlieb August Wilhelm Herrich-Schäffer in 1855. It is known from Hungary, Romania, Ukraine and Russia.

References

Phycitini
Monotypic moth genera
Moths of Europe
Pyralidae genera